"Poison" is a song by English electronic music group the Prodigy, released on 6 March 1995 as the fourth and final single from their second studio album, Music for the Jilted Generation (1994). Maxim Reality sings on this track. It was a number one hit in Finland, while peaking inside the top five in Ireland and Norway. Additionally, it peaked within the top 30 in Sweden and Switzerland.

Composition
The drums in the song are samples from "It's a New Day" by Skull Snaps, "Amen, Brother" by the Winstons, and "Heavy Soul Slinger" by Bernard Purdie.

Critical reception
John Bush from AllMusic viewed the song as "excellent". Larry Flick from Billboard noted that it "marks the rave outfit's first foray into hip-hop", adding that "it's an inspired move. The act's penchant for quirky loops and industrial sound effects melds perfectly with the track's approachable downtempo groove." He also described the track as a "juicy jam", voiced by new band member Maxim Reality. Brad Beatnik from Music Week'''s RM Dance Update stated that "with its hard hip hop beats yet funky feel, [it] is the stunning stand-out track" of the album. Another editor, James Hamilton, declared it as a "ponderously rumbling reggae-ish dub joller". James Hunter from Vibe described it as "an excellent post-techno techno thing that ought to become an enormous, obnoxious hit."

In 2022, Time Out ranked "Poison" number 26 in their list of "50 Best '90s Songs". The magazine added, "There are a ton of tracks from the Prodge that could be included in this list, but none sum up Keith Flint and Liam Howlett’s rowdy rave punks better than ‘Poison’. The mix of chunky breakbeats, sludgy electronics and wide-eyed carnage was the perfect rhythmical remedy to those who fancied a dab of dance music (and those who wanted to find out what the hell rave culture might have been about), but just couldn’t get to grips with the eight-minute Chicago house workouts of the time."

Chart performance
"Poison" reached number one in Finland and was a top-five hit in Norway. The song also reached number 24 in Sweden, and number 23 in Switzerland.

Artwork
The packaging for the CD single follows a theme similar to the song: rat poison. The front cover features a box of said poison, the back shows a picture of a dead and decomposing rodent, and the CD itself has a rat superimposed onto it. The theme of rat poison ties into the music, as the official remix of the song is dubbed "Rat Poison".

Music video
The accompanying music video for "Poison" was directed by Walter Stern. The band performs the track in a basement-like location. By the end of the video, the floor has turned into a mud-bath where Keith Flint is mud wrestling with other band members.

The music video was also shown on an episode of Beavis and Butt-head.

Soundtracks
The song is featured on the soundtracks for the 1999 film End of Days and the 1997 film The Jackal. It's also featured briefly in the 1999 Robbie the Reindeer film Hooves of Fire.

it also appeared on the FIFA 21 Volta football soundtrack.

Legacy
The spoken words on the introductory of the album version :
 "Liam, someone on the phone for you / Aw fuck's sake, tryin' to write this fuckin' tune, man"They were parodied by Clark on his remix of Milanese's “Mr Bad News”, where a voices with an affected received pronunciation English accent say “Christopher, somebody's on the telephone for you / Oh for fuck’s sake, I’m trying to write this fucking tune, man”.

Electronic rock band Does It Offend You, Yeah? also make reference to the track's opening conversation on their song "We Are the Dead"'' from their album Don't Say We Didn't Warn You.

Track listing
"Poison" (95 EQ) – 6:12 [edited 4:05 version on CD edition]
"Rat Poison" – 5:34
"Scienide" – 5:54
"Poison" (Environmental Science Dub Mix) – 6:18

 Tracks 1-2 and 4 written by Liam Howlett and Keith Palmer. Track 2 remixed by Liam Howlett. Track 4 remix and additional production by Environmental Science
 Track 3 written by Liam Howlett

Charts

References

External links
 

The Prodigy songs
1995 singles
XL Recordings singles
Songs written by Liam Howlett
1994 songs
Music videos directed by Walter Stern
Number-one singles in Finland